Mario Henderson (October 29, 1984 – October 21, 2020) was an American professional football player who was an offensive tackle in the National Football League (NFL). He spent the first four years of his career with the Oakland Raiders, after being selected from Florida State in the 2007 NFL Draft.

High school and college career
Henderson originally attended Bishop Verot High School in Fort Myers, Florida. Henderson was a 375-pound freshman who'd never played football. His first year of football was his Freshman year. He also played varsity in the 2000-2001 season at Verot.

After his sophomore year, Henderson transferred to Lehigh Senior High School. Due to transfer rules, he was not able to play during his junior year. He used that time to change his physique and, in his senior year, earned a scholarship to Florida State University. His senior year, he averaged 28 points per game and 14 rebounds, and was 1st team all state and 1st team all county as a member of Lehigh Senior basketball team.

Professional career

Oakland Raiders
After starting only one year his senior year of college, Henderson was selected by the Raiders in the third round of the 2007 NFL Draft. In his second year, he started several games at left tackle in place of injured veteran Kwame Harris, and was the Raiders' full-time left tackle in 2008, 2009, and 2010.

Colorado Ice
Henderson played with the Colorado Ice of the Indoor Football League for the 2011 season.

San Diego Chargers
Henderson signed with the San Diego Chargers on April 13, 2012. He was released during final roster cuts on August 31, 2012.

Utah Blaze
Henderson signed with the Utah Blaze of the Arena Football League (AFL) on November 9, 2012. He was placed on the reserve/refused to report list on March 1, 2013.

Colorado Ice (second stint)
Henderson re-signed with the Colorado Ice in May 2013.

Tampa Bay Storm
Henderson signed with the Tampa Bay Storm of the AFL in March 2014. He re-signed with the team after the 2014 season on October 9, 2014. He was placed on the reserve/refused to report list on March 5, 2015. He was placed on reassignment on March 1, 2016.

Personal life
On March 17, 2011, Henderson was arrested in Fort Myers on the charge of carrying a concealed firearm.

On October 21, 2020, Henderson died at the age of 35.

References

External links

1984 births
2020 deaths
Sportspeople from Fort Myers, Florida
Players of American football from Florida
American football offensive tackles
Florida State Seminoles football players
Place of death missing
Oakland Raiders players
San Diego Chargers players
Utah Blaze players
Colorado Crush (IFL) players
Tampa Bay Storm players